The Manchester Clayton by-election of 18 February 1922 was held after the death of the Conservative politician and Member of Parliament (MP) Edward Hopkinson. Labour took the seat in the by-election.

Candidates
William Henry Flanagan was the Conservative and Unionist candidate and was a Wadding and Wool Merchant.
John Edward Sutton was the Labour candidate and was a trade union official.

Results

See also 
 List of United Kingdom by-elections (1918–1931)

References

1922 elections in the United Kingdom
Clayton
1922 in England
1920s in Manchester